Yevgeniy Sharlat is Professor of Composition at the University of Texas at Austin Butler School of Music.  He is a 2020 Guggenheim Fellow.

References

Living people
University of Texas at Austin faculty
1977 births